Wodzierady  is a village in Łask County, Łódź Voivodeship, in central Poland. It is the seat of the gmina (administrative district) called Gmina Wodzierady.

References

Wodzierady